East Hill Cemetery, also known as Maryland Hill, Round Hill, Rooster Hill, and City Cemetery, is a historic cemetery located at Bristol, Virginia. It is an American Civil War-era cemetery established in 1857, with sections for Confederate soldiers and veterans as well as a small section for African American burials. In 1995, the United Daughters of the Confederacy put up a small commemorative monument to the Civil War dead. Among its graves are the founders of the city, representatives of enslaved African-Americans, Civil War soldiers including those who died as a result of the war as well as those who survived the war, a Revolutionary War General of Militia Evan Shelby, and many who have made contributions to Bristol and the
nation. It straddles the Tennessee-Virginia border.

It was listed on the National Register of Historic Places in 2011.

Notable burials
 Evan Shelby, Revolutionary War General of Militia, father of Isaac Shelby, first Governor of Kentucky
 Col Abram Fulkerson, Virginia House of Delegates and Congressman

See also
 List of cemeteries in Tennessee.

References

External links
 

Cemeteries on the National Register of Historic Places in Tennessee
Cemeteries on the National Register of Historic Places in Virginia
1857 establishments in Tennessee
1857 establishments in Virginia
National Register of Historic Places in Bristol, Virginia
Buildings and structures in Sullivan County, Tennessee
Buildings and structures in Bristol, Virginia